Euanthia or Euantheia may refer to:
Aydın, an ancient Greek town now in Turkey
Oeantheia, a town of ancient Locris, Greece